McClellandville is an unincorporated community in New Castle County, in the U.S. state of Delaware. McClellandville is located at the intersection of Delaware Route 896 and Wedgewood Road, northwest of Newark.

History
A post office called McClellandville was established in 1853, and remained in operation until 1908. The community was named for William McClelland, a pioneer settler.

McClellandville contains two properties listed on the National Register of Historic Places: the Samuel Lindsey House and the Wesley M.E. Church.

References

Unincorporated communities in New Castle County, Delaware
Unincorporated communities in Delaware